Epidendrum unguiculatum is a species of orchid.

unguiculatum